Pandeli Cale (1879–1923) was one of the signatories of the Albanian Declaration of Independence, who subsequently served as Minister of Agriculture in the Provisional Government of Albania.

Biography
Pandeli Cale was born in Korçë on 28 March 1879. He finished the French Classic Lyceum in Alexandria, Egypt. During 1900-1904 he worked in the Bucharest Albanian colony, returning in Albania in 1904. Sent by the Albanian diaspora in Romania to be their representative in southern Albania, Cale aimed to influence Orthodox Christians to join an uprising if Muslims and their beys would rise against the empire. Cale was also insistent on forming guerrilla bands and suggested that care should be taken when choosing teher leaders from among Albanian patriots. He was one of the co-founders of the Secret Albanian Committee in Thessaloniki, together with Themistokli Gërmenji, and Midhat Frashëri. He was president of the society "Freedom's Band" in 1908. In February 1909, he was elected secretary of the society "Lidhja orthodhokse". He was quite active during the Albanian uprisings of 1910 – 1912, participating in one local guerrilla. He was participant of the November 5, 1912 meeting, and voluntarily accompanying Ismail Qemali in his way to Albania.
On November 28, 1912, as a delegate of Korça region, he signed the Albanian declaration of independence as  "Pandeli Cale". He was elected Minister of Agriculture, Industry and Commerce in Ismail Qemali's cabinet. He led the negotiations with Count Leopold Berchtold, foreign minister of Austria-Hungary, and the British and Italian ambassadors which led to those countries' support for Albanian autonomy.

The first years of World War I would find him in Switzerland, Ukraine, Bulgaria, and France. In 1919, he returned to Albania. He is mentioned as part of the Albanian in the League of Nations Committee of the Peace Conference in 1919, together with Fan Noli, Hil Mosi, Gjergj Adhamidhi (Frashëri), lobbying for the Albanian membership application, so much contested by Greece and Yugoslavia. Pandeli was the designer and signer of the Kapshtica Protocol. The same year he got elected Mayer of Korçë, and later in February 1921 member of the first Albanian parliament. Died due to serious health implications in an hospital in Thessaloniki, Greece.

Notes

References

Sources 
"History of Albanian People" Albanian Academy of Science.

1879 births
1923 deaths
Signatories of the Albanian Declaration of Independence
People from Korçë
20th-century Albanian politicians
19th-century Albanian politicians
People from Manastir vilayet
Albanian expatriates in Romania
Government ministers of Albania
Agriculture ministers of Albania
Public Works ministers of Albania
All-Albanian Congress delegates